Cawang Station (CW) is a class II railway station located at Jl. Tebet Timur Dalam 11, East Tebet, Tebet, South Jakarta, Indonesia. The station, which is located at the altitude of +26 meters, is included in Operational Area I Jakarta of Kereta Api Indonesia and only serves the KRL Commuterline route. Part of the station is located below Jakarta Inner Ring Road and M.T. Haryono street.

Although named as Cawang, administratively the station is not located in Cawang, Kramat Jati, East Jakarta, but is located some distance to the west of the subdistrict, and borders with Kebon Baru, Tebet, South Jakarta at its east.

Building and layout 
This station has two railway tracks, where both tracks are straight tracks. Cawang Station has connection with Cikoko Stasiun Cawang TransJakarta bus station which serves corridor 9 and upcoming Cikoko Station of the Jabodebek LRT via short walk.

Services
The following is a list of train services at Cawang Station.

Passenger services 
 KAI Commuter

Supporting transportation

References

South Jakarta
Railway stations in Jakarta